Burbach on the northern edge of the Waldeifel region is a municipality in the district of Bitburg-Prüm, in Rhineland-Palatinate, western Germany.

Also within the municipality of Burbach are Neustraßburg and the settlements and hamlets of Burbachermühle (also known as Evensmühle), Dahlheckhof, Hof Lietzkreuz, In der Katzenbach, and Neuenweiher.

References

Bitburg-Prüm